X Factor is an Italian television music competition to find new singing talent; the winner receives a € 300,000 recording contract with Sony Music. Before the start of the auditions process it was announced that Morgan and Mika would be confirmed as judges and mentors, whilst Victoria Cabello and Fedez have been chosen for replacing Simona Ventura and Elio in the role; also Alessandro Cattelan returned as host. The eighth season has been airing on Sky Uno since 18 September 2014.

Auditions for season 8 took place in Rome, Turin and Bologna in June 2014; bootcamp took place in Milan for two days, on 1 and 2 July. Unconfirmed rumors revealed that Mika will mentor the Over-25s, Fedez the boys, Cabello the girls and Morgan the groups; they selected their final three acts during judges' houses.

Lorenzo Fragola, a member of the category Boys and mentored by Fedez, was announced the winner of the competition on 11 December 2014. His winner's single, "The Reason Why", released at the end of the Semi-Final on 4 December, won a Gold Certification of sales.

Cast 

Vocal coaches: Paola Folli e Rossana Casale.

Applications and auditions

A preliminary phase of auditions was held:
at PalaLottomatica, Rome, from 10 to 12 May 2014;
at Lingotto, Turin, from 24 to 26 May 2014.

The judges auditions was held:
at Unipol Arena, Bologna, on 7 and 9 June 2014;
at PalaLottomatica, Rome, from 21 to 22 June 2014.
The auditions were then broadcast on Sky Uno from 18 September to 2 October, and on Cielo from 21 September to 5 October.

Bootcamp
Bootcamp took place at Mediolanum Forum, Assago, over two days, on Tuesday 1 July and Wednesday 2 July; it was broadcast on 9 October on Sky Uno and on 12 October on Cielo.
Before Bootcamp, all the contestants who passed the auditions, were divided into two groups: the first one passed directly to the Bootcamp, since it was made by singers who fully convinced the judges; the other one was made by singers who didn't fully convince the judges, thus they had to face the “Room Auditions”. These were held into the Forum; the ones who succeeded in the Room Auditions, passed to the Bootcamp.
For the first time in Italy, besides the presence of spectators at the Bootcamp, to pick the six contestants from each category, the “Six Chair Challenge” was introduced: each judge has six chairs at their disposal and they can decide to make a contestant sit (thus passing them to the “Home Visit”) or not (eliminating them); if the chairs are all occupied, the judge of the specific category can decide to make a contestant stand up (eliminating them) and make the other sit on the chair. After the Bootcamp, 24 contestants passed to the Home Visit.

Judges' houses
The “Home Visit” is the final phase before the Live Shows. In this phase, the contestants who passed the Bootcamp had to perform one last time in front of their specific judge, in four different locations. At the end of this audition, the top twelve contestants were chosen.

The Home Visit took place in four different locations decided by each judge: Cabello chose London, Fedez chose Milan, Mika chose Motya and Morgan chose Vienna. Each judge was also helped by a guest to choose: The Bloody Beetroots for Cabello, Raphael Gualazzi for Fedez, Elio for Mika and Eugenio Finardi for Morgan. The Homevist took place around the end of July 2014.

Between the eliminated in this phase, those written in bold in the following chart were chosen by the judges for re-proposal.  The four ones were then voted by the public who decided to bring Riccardo Schiara back in the competition during the second Liveshow.
The twelve eliminated acts were:
Boys: Dirty, Riccardo Schiara, Dario Guidi
Girls: Giorgia Bertolani, Carolina Faroni, Maria Faiola
25+: Alessio Bersaglini, Jade Angiolina Canali, Sarah Fargion
Groups: Fading Memories, Aula 39, Les Babettes

Contestants and categories
Key:
 – Winner
 – Runner-up
 – Third place

Live shows

Results summary
The number of votes received by each act were released by Sky Italia after the final.

Colour key

Live show details

Week 1 (23 October 2014)
Group performance: Medley of famous songs performed by the twelve contestants ("Try" / "Wrecking Ball" / "Paparazzi" / "No Woman No Cry" / "Forever Young" / "With or Without You" / "Someone Like You" / "Penso Positivo" / "Happy Ending")
Celebrity performers: Tiziano Ferro ("Senza Scappare Mai Più") and Robin Schulz & Lilly Wood and the Prick ("Prayer in C")

Judges' votes to eliminate
 Morgan: Diluvio – backed his own act, The Wise.
 Mika: The Wise – backed his own act, Diluvio.
 Fedez: Diluvio – considered him inappropriate for the show.
 Cabello: Diluvio – agreed with Fedez.

Week 2 (30 October 2014)
Group performance: "Logico #1" (Cesare Cremonini and the contestants)
Celebrity performers: Cesare Cremonini ("Logico #1") and ("Greygoose")

Wildcard

Judges' votes to eliminate
 Morgan: The Wise
 Mika: The Wise
 Fedez: The Wise
 Cabello was not required to vote because there was already a majority, but confirmed she would have eliminated The Wise.

Week 3 (6 November 2014)
Theme: Dance
Celebrity performers: Charli XCX ("Boom Clap") and Kiesza ("Hideaway")
Trivia: During the opening of the show, the host and the judges of the new season of Italia's Got Talent came on stage to promote it.

Judge's vote to eliminate
 Cabello: Vivian Grillo - after a moment of hesitation, considered Magli's growth more interesting.
 Mika: Vivian Grillo - agreed with Cabello's comments.
 Fedez: Camilla Andrea Magli - considered Grillo more interesting.
 Morgan: Camilla Andrea Magli - could not decide so chose to take it to deadlock.
With both acts receiving two votes each, the result went to deadlock and a new public vote commenced for 200 seconds. Camilla Andrea Magli was eliminated as the act with the fewest public votes.

Week 4 (13 November 2014)
Theme: Tolerance (billed as: We are 1)
Celebrity performers: Hozier ("Take Me to Church") and Fabi, Silvestri, Gazzè ("L'amore non esiste")
Trivia: Songs assigned for this week suffered from censorship, talk about freedom of expression or are about controversial themes such as bullying or discrimination.

Judges' votes to eliminate
 Morgan: Spritz For Five - abandoned the studio straight after he made his decision.
 Cabello: Spritz For Five - followed their mentor's decision.
 Mika: Komminuet - based on the final showdown performances.
 Fedez: Komminuet - could not decide so chose to take it to deadlock.
With both acts receiving two votes each, the result went to deadlock and reverted to the earlier public vote. Spritz For Five eliminated as the act with the fewest public votes.

Week 5 (20 November 2014)
Theme: "Apocalypse Night" (double elimination)
Celebrity performers: Francesco De Gregori ("La Donna Cannone") and Ed Sheeran ("Thinking Out Loud")
Trivia: Two rounds, on the first, each contestant brought a one-minute-snippet of a song they had previously sung and there was a direct elimination; on the second, each contestant brought a song picked by their mentors and there was a Final Showdown between the two least voted contestants.
Also, Morgan who in the previous week stated he would abandon the show, came back as the fourth judge.

Judges' votes to eliminate
 Cabello: Leiner Riflessi – backed her own act, Vivian Grillo.
 Fedez: Vivian Grillo – backed his own act, Leiner Riflessi.
 Morgan: Leiner Riflessi – felt Riflessi could be commended more outside the show.
 Mika: Vivian Grillo - felt Grillo was not at ease on stage but could not decide so chose to take it to deadlock.
With both acts receiving two votes each, the result went to deadlock and reverted to the earlier public vote. Vivian Grillo was eliminated as the act with the fewest public votes.

Week 6: Quarter-final (27 November 2014)
Theme: Mentor's Choice (first round); "Light" (second round)
Celebrity performers: Marco Mengoni ("Guerriero") and Fedez and Francesca Michielin ("Magnifico")
Trivia: Two rounds, on the first, each contestant sang a song chosen by their mentors; on the second, each contestant sang a song chosen from the ones voted by the public on-line.

Judges' votes to eliminate
 Morgan: Mario Gavino Garrucciu - backed his own act, Komminuet.
 Mika: Komminuet - backed his own act, Mario Gavino Garrucciu.
 Cabello: Komminuet - said she always stood for Garrucciu.
 Fedez: Mario Gavino Garriucciu - could not decide so chose to take it to deadlock.
With both acts receiving two votes each, the result went to deadlock and a new public vote commenced for 200 seconds. Komminuet were eliminated as the act with the fewest public votes.

Week 7: Semi-final (4 December 2014)
Group performance: "Counting Stars" (with Ryan Tedder)
Celebrity performers: OneRepublic ("I Lived")
Theme: Apocalypse Night: two contestants eliminated. First round: Original songs; Second round: Mentor's choice.

Judges' votes to eliminate
 Cabello: Emma Morton - backed her own act, Ilaria Rastrelli.
 Mika: Ilaria Rastrelli - backed his own act, Emma Morton.
 Fedez: Emma Morton - gave no reason, but said he was hoping for a deadlock since the decision was too hard.
 Morgan: Emma Morton - said he had always supported Rastrelli.

Week 8: Final (11 December 2014)
Theme: Celebrity Duets (Round 1); Original Songs (Round 2); Own Choice (Round 3; billed as My Song)
Group performance: Mika, the Finalists and the ex-contestants (Good Guys and Happy Ending)
Celebrity performers: Chiara (Un Giorno di Sole), Saint Motel (My Type), David Guetta & Sam Martin (Dangerous), Tiziano Ferro (La differenza tra me e te, Senza scappare mai più, La fine)

References

External links
 X Factor Italia

2014 Italian television seasons
Italian music television series
Italy 08
X Factor (Italian TV series)